George Henry Lynn (31 March 1848 – 21 September 1921) was an English cricketer.  Lynn's batting and bowling styles are unknown.  He was born at East Grinstead, Sussex.

Lynn made his first-class debut for Sussex against Gloucestershire in 1872.  He made seven further first-class appearances for the county, the last of which came against Kent in 1873.  In his eight first-class matches for Sussex, he scored a total of 128 runs at an average of 9.84, with a high score of 25.  With the ball, he took a single wicket, that of Surrey's Charles Chenery.

He died at the town of his birth on 21 September 1921.

References

External links
George Lynn at ESPNcricinfo
George Lynn at CricketArchive

1848 births
1921 deaths
People from East Grinstead
English cricketers
Sussex cricketers